Mapa or MAPA may refer to:

People
 Alec Mapa (born 1965), American actor, comedian and writer
 Dennis Mapa (born 1969), Filipino economist and statistician
 Jao Mapa (born 1976), Filipino actor
 Placido Mapa Jr. (born 1932), Filipino businessman, economist, and government official
 Suraj Mapa (born 1980), Sri Lankan actor
 Victorino Mapa (1855–1927), Filipino chief justice and government official

Other uses 
 "Mapa" (song), a 2021 song by SB19
 Mexican American Political Association
 Mapa (publisher), an Israeli subsidiary of Ituran
 Mapa Group, a Turkish conglomerate
 Mapa, a company producing latex gloves that merged with Hutchinson SA in 1973
 Most Affected People and Areas, a climate justice concept

See also
 
 Mappa (disambiguation)
 Mapah (disambiguation)